Usulután is the fifth largest city in El Salvador, and capital of the Usulután Department in the south-east of El Salvador.

As of 2006, it is estimated to have population of 71,636 people. Usulután rests in a rich agricultural valley and has very high and humid temperatures most of the year as it is located close to the Pacific Ocean. The city was badly damaged by the Salvadorian earthquakes of February 2001, in addition to Hurricane Mitch in 1998.

The main Catholic Church of the town is located in a park area next to the Town Hall (Alcaldia) and next to the Cine Centenario (a cinema) which are roughly located at the center of the town. Recently, Usulután has modernized considerably, having more influence from brand names such as Pollo Campero (a chicken restaurant), Biggest (a hamburger place similar to America's Burger King), and more eateries that were not available there in the past.

Sport
It is home to one of the most successful soccer clubs in the country C.D. Luis Ángel Firpo, who play at Sergio Torres Stadium. Sergio Torres Stadium is the only stadium in the country that is fully owned by the soccer club.  The local teams' colors are white, red and Blue.  They play in the Salvadoran League, The Primera División of the Liga de Fútbol Profesional.

Notable births
 Schafik Handal, politician
 Elías Antonio Saca González, politician, Salvadoran president (2004-2009)
 Angelica Flores, entrepreneur, founder of Tacos Maya
 Álvaro Torres, musician
 Rodolfo Zelaya, football player
 Osael Romero, football player

References 

Municipalities of the Usulután Department